The Hunter 30T is an American sailboat that was first built in 1991.

The Hunter 30T is a development of the 1988 Hunter 30-2 design.

The design was originally marketed by the manufacturer as the Hunter 30, but is now usually referred to as the Hunter 30T to differentiate it from the unrelated 1973 Hunter 30 design and the 30-2, which was also marketed as the Hunter 30.

Production
The design was built by Hunter Marine in the United States between 1991 and 1994, but it is now out of production.

Design
The Hunter 30T is a recreational keelboat, built predominantly of fiberglass. It has a fractional sloop rig, a raked stem, a walk-through reverse transom with a swim platform, an internally mounted spade-type rudder controlled by a wheel and a fixed wing keel. It displaces  and carries  of ballast.

The design features a "T"-shaped cockpit, 110% genoa, double line lines, a teak and holly cabin sole, seven opening ports and five opening hatches, a dinette table a fully enclosed head with a shower, vanity and mirror, sleeping accommodation for seven people, a two-burner stove and double stainless steel sinks, an icebox. An anchor and lifejackets were included as standard equipment.

See also
List of sailing boat types

Related development
Hunter 30
Hunter 30-2

Similar sailboats
Alberg 30
Alberg Odyssey 30
Aloha 30
Annie 30
Bahama 30
Bristol 29.9
C&C 1/2 Ton
C&C 30
C&C 30 Redwing
Catalina 30
Catalina 309
CS 30
Grampian 30
Hunter 29.5
Hunter 306
J/30
Kirby 30
Leigh 30
Mirage 30
Mirage 30 SX
Nonsuch 30
Pearson 303
S2 9.2
Santana 30/30
Seafarer 30

References

External links
Official factory brochure

Keelboats
1990s sailboat type designs
Sailing yachts
Sailboat types built by Hunter Marine